This article contains a list of fossil-bearing stratigraphic units in the state of Vermont, U.S.

Sites

See also

 Paleontology in Vermont

References

 

Vermont
Stratigraphic units
Stratigraphy of Vermont
Vermont geography-related lists
United States geology-related lists